Shantae is the title character and main protagonist of the Shantae video game series developed and published by WayForward Technologies. She was created by Erin Bozon, wife of Matt Bozon, WayForward's creative director. She has been voiced by Cristina Vee since 2014's Shantae and the Pirate's Curse.

Shantae is a half-genie, the daughter of a human father and a mother who was a Guardian Genie. She consequently has limited magical powers, including her signature whipping hair and magical dances that allow her to change into magical creatures, and has to rely on her skills and magical items that she acquires during her adventures to fight her adversaries.

The character has been well received and is featured in several lists of the greatest video game heroines. Shantae has since become WayForward's mascot.

Concept and creation

Erin Bozon, wife of WayForward's creative director Matt Bozon, came up with the idea for Shantae in 1994 while coming back from a day camp where she worked as a counselor. The character was named after one of the campers. She came up with the basic design and had the idea that she could whip her hair as a weapon and would use dancing to charm or summon animals, which was later changed to transformations into animals and mythological creatures. Matt Bozon tried to incorporate more conventional weaponry to the concept, but ultimately reverted to fighting moves which incorporated Shantae's hair. Erin Bozon's initial inspiration for the character was the TV show I Dream of Jeannie, while Matt's subsequent work on the character and her universe were based on Ranma ½, Nadia: The Secret of Blue Water or Hayao Miyazaki's films, as he was introduced to Japanese animation around that time while studying at CalArts.

By 1997, Shantae's design was still not completely locked, as she sported brown hair, didn't wear earrings but wore golden bracelets, and had different proportions. At that point, her magic was still meant to summon animals, her dances were generating magical attacks based on the four elements, and she had different outfits giving her different abilities. By the year 2000, Matt Bozon had locked the final proportions and her ultimate graphical style, adding earrings and replacing the bracelets with wrist guards, and coloring her hair into her signature purple.

After the first game, Matt Bozon worked to make the character easier for other people to work with. Her hip sash was progressively removed, and attempts to turn the character into 3-D generated a new batch of issues as her initial appearance had to be revamped to make her look more natural, with her hair in particular blocking the view and needing to move naturally. Various experiments were done to make her feel more kid-like and heroic, but feedback was mixed, which led to reverting to a look closer to her original one, but with the clothing alterations kept. For Shantae: Half-Genie Hero, her proportions were altered, being described by WayForward as featuring "[a] bowling pin shaped body, [...] very tall eyes, [...] [a] long torso, and black triangular pants" with the main aim being on-screen contrast and readability regardless of the distance from the camera. Her lighter skin on the first sketches in contrast to her former design generated minor controversy, and WayForward worked to fix it later on.

In Shantae: Risky's Revenge, Shantae was voiced by Meagan Glaser. For all subsequent appearances, the character has been portrayed by voice actress Cristina Vee, who had started collaborating with WayForward in 2012.

Appearances
In the first game, Shantae is described as a half-genie, the offspring of a human father and Guardian Genie mother whom she never met, as they disappeared when she was only a baby. She wishes to prove her worth as Scuttle Town's Guardian Genie, despite her scarce magical abilities. She is described as a "spirited dancer with a strong sense of right and wrong", and "trouble-prone". When the evil lady-pirate Risky Boots comes to the town and steals her adoptive uncle Mimic's steam engine, she sets on an adventure to stop Risky and recover the engine. By the end of the game, she has come to terms with her nature and is relieved to hear from Mayor Scuttlebutt that the fact she is not a full genie doesn't matter, since she proved her worth by stopping Risky.

In the sequel, Risky's Revenge, Risky Boots sets to take her revenge on Shantae, and ultimately succeeds by stripping her of her magical powers. This, however, backfires in Shantae and the Pirate's Curse when the magic that escaped Shantae's body awakens Risky's old mentor, the Pirate Master, which leads to Shantae and Risky reaching a temporary truce to defeat him, as Shantae needs to fight with magical items and Risky's pirate equipment since she no longer has her powers. Shantae ultimately succeeds and recovers her magic.

In Shantae: Half-Genie Hero, Risky reverts to being the antagonist, as she tries to take control of the Genie Realm, an ethereal place where all Guardian Genies were locked several years ago, when Shantae was only an infant. Shantae thwarts Risky's plans and the genies reward Shantae by informing her of her mother's whereabouts: Shantae's mother left to the Genie Realm long ago with other genies to ward evil beings, leaving Shantae in Mimic's custody, asking her to understand her sacrifice and reassuring her of her love.

In Shantae and the Seven Sirens, Shantae and her friends visit a tropical island, where she meets a group of other half-genies who are kidnapped by Risky and the island's rulers, the Seven Sirens. Shantae rescues the half-genies, defeats the Sirens' leader and receives a journal filled with messages from the Guardian Genies, including her mother.

Other appearances
Outside of the Shantae series, Shantae has been featured as a guest character in a number of other games. She appeared as a playable character in the 2015 WayForward Apple Watch game Watch Quest. She was also featured in the 2010 downloadable WarioWare: D.I.Y. microgame Shantae NAB!, created by Matt Bozon.

Shantae appeared as a guest character in Mutant Mudds Super Challenge and in Runbow and Blaster Master Zero as a downloadable guest character.

Shantae appears in Super Smash Bros. Ultimate as a spirit. A Mii Brawler costume based on her was released as downloadable content for the game on June 29, 2021.

Reception
Publishers were initially skeptical regarding the character, and asked Matt Bozon to consider switching to a male lead, as they believed male gamers would never play as a female lead character. Matt Bozon stood by Shantae, believing that she "had to exist" to see "if there was an audience reaching back", although, after the game's commercial failure, he later acknowledged that publishers probably "genuinely knew their markets". Despite the initial difficulties, the series' lasting critical appeal led WayForward to adopt Shantae as their official mascot. Shantae herself was well received by fans and critics.

In 2017, readers of NintendoLife voted Shantae as the 8th-top most wanted character for Super Smash Bros. Ultimate. In 2018, readers of Source Gaming.com voted Shantae as the 10th-top most wanted character for Super Smash Bros. Ultimate. In 2020, Shantae was ranked 13th-top most requested character for a DLC.

Michael Rougeau for Complex included Shantae in his list of the greatest heroines in video game history in 2013, declaring that "there's [...] something about the half-genie girl". In 2017, Robert Workman of Comicbook.com named Shantae in his list of the greatest video game heroines, having some reservations about her sexy design, but claiming that "there's no question that this genie has had no trouble making players' wishes come true". Chris Isaac of Comic Book Resources listed Shantae 11th in his list of female video game characters making a huge impact in 2017.  Daniel Alvarez for TheGamer.com called Shantae a "famous Half-Genie Hero herself", describing her as "the undisputed queen of indie characters".

References

Shantae
Fictional genies
Fictional human hybrids
Fictional dancers
Dancer characters in video games
Female characters in video games
Shapeshifter characters in video games
Video game characters who use magic
Video game characters introduced in 2002
Fantasy video game characters
Video game mascots
Video game protagonists